Sundtoft is a Norwegian surname. Notable people with the surname include:

Kristian Sundtoft (1937–2015), Norwegian politician
Tine Sundtoft (born 1967), Norwegian civil servant and politician

Norwegian-language surnames